WMTD can refer to:

 WMTD (AM), a radio station broadcasting at 1380 kHz on the AM band, licensed to Hinton, West Virginia
 WMTD-FM, a radio station broadcasting at 102.3 MHz on the FM band, licensed to Hinton, West Virginia